Tom Coughlan may refer to:
 Tom Coughlan (hurler)
 Tom Coughlan (football)
 Tom Coughlan (rugby union)